Sindoh (Korean: 신도), formerly Sindoricoh (Korean: 신도리코), is a South Korean company that makes multi-function printers, fax machines, Thermal paper and 3D printers. Headquartered in Seoul, South Korea, Sindoh's main market for 2D printers is Korea and the United States and Europe for its 3D printers.

The company was founded in 1960 under the title of Sindoh Trading Co., Ltd. The name was changed to Sindoh Co., Ltd. in 1969 after the company entered into a partnership with Japanese corporation Ricoh.

History 

1960: Founded on July 7.
1964: Production of RICOPY555, Korea's first copier
1969: Signed a partnership with Ricoh, Japan. Produced BS-1, the first electronic copying machine in Korea.
1971: Head office construction was completed in Seongsu-dong, Seoul.
1975: Produced DT1200, the first plain-paper copier in Korea
1981: Produced FAX3300H, Korea's first facsimile
1982: Produced Thermal paper for fax  
1983: Completed the construction of Asan factory 
1986: Inauguration of CEO and Chairman Woo Sang-gi and CEO and President Woo Suk-hyung
1990: Production of High Sensitive Thermal Paper for fax
1991: Launched copier FT-1000 with its own technology
2003: Launched the operation of Qingdao 1st factory in China
2006: Launched the operation of Qingdao 2nd factory in China
2014: Launched Sindoh VINA Headquarters (SVH) operation for the Southeast Asian production base
2015: Launched Sindoh VINA Marketing (SVM) operation for the Southeast Asian sales base
2016: Launched 3DWOX DP200, its first 3D printer.
2017: Launched 3DWOX 2X, its first prosumer 3D printer.
2017: Launched the operation of Sindoh VINA 2nd factory in Vietnam 
2017: Launched the official international Sindoh YouTube Channel
2018: Launched 3DWOX 1, with better solution 
2018: Launched 3DWOX 1, with better solution 
2019: Launched 3DWOX 1X, its substance 3D printer
2019: Launched Sindoh A1/A1+, its first and only SLA 3D Printer.
2019: Launched 3DWOX 7X, This 3D printer supports large output.
2020: Launched Sindoh S100, its first and only SLS 3D Printer.
2021: Launched Sindoh A1SD, its first and only MSLA(Masked Stereolithography) & LCD 3D Printer.
2022: Launched Sindoh fabWeaver type A530, its new FFF 3D Printer

Logo 
Sindoh renewed its corporate identity in 2013, as part of efforts to strengthen its brand.

Printer / Multi-function printer 
Sindoh produces and sales Mono/Color Multi-function Printer from various A3/A4 lineup.

3D printers 
Sindoh entered the 3D printer market with its own brand, 3DWOX. In 2016 the company launched DP200 and DP201, two models under the 3DWOX brand name. The DP200 printer was designed to introduce inexperienced users to 3D printing technology.

In 2016 Sindoh, in conjunction with SolidWorks, introduced 3D-printing software which enables users to 3D print using a CAD program without slicer software. The company entered into a partnership with SolidWorks, and developed an "Apps for Kids" program in 2017. This has allowed children to 3D print easily and from the cloud. And, Sindoh launched 3DWOX 2X. The 3D printer market can be distinguished from the personal consumer market and professional market. 3DWOX 2X was developed in the middle of the market, Prosumer.

Printing solutions 
Sindoh offers solutions to optimize corporate printing environments. In 2008, Sindoh introduced their managed printing service (MPS), which reduces maintenance costs of document management.

See also 
 Multi-function printer
 List of 3D printer manufacturers

References 

Manufacturing companies based in Seoul
Electronics companies of South Korea
South Korean brands
3D printers
3D printer companies
Computer printer companies